The two-stage 2015 MLS Re-Entry Draft took place on December 11, 2015, (stage 1) and December 17, 2015, (stage 2). All 20 Major League Soccer clubs were eligible to participate. The priority order for the draft was reverse order of finish in 2015, taking into account play-off performance. 
 
Available to all teams in stage 1 of the re-entry draft were:
 Players who were at least 23-years-old and had a minimum of three MLS service years whose options were not exercised by their clubs (available at option salary for 2016).
 Players who were at least 25-years-old with a minimum of four years of MLS experience who were out of contract and whose club did not wish to re-sign them at their previous salary (available for at least their 2015 salary).
 Free agents who chose to participate.

Players who were not selected in stage 1 were made available in stage 2. Clubs selecting players in stage 2 were able to negotiate a new salary with the player. Players who remained unselected after stage 2 were made available to any MLS club on a first-come, first-served basis.

Teams also had the option of passing on their selection.

Available players
Players were required to meet age and service requirements to participate as stipulated by the terms of the MLS collective bargaining agreement. The league released a list of all players available for the re-entry draft on December 7, 2015.

Stage One
The first stage of the 2015 MLS Re-Entry Draft took place on December 11, 2015.

Round 1

Round 1 trades

Round 2

Stage two
The second stage of the 2015 MLS re-entry draft took place on December 17, 2015.

Round 1

Round 2

References 

Major League Soccer drafts
Mls Re-entry Draft, 2015
MLS Re-Entry Draft